The Bo Plains are located in the south of Sierra Leone by the city of Bo.  The plains are mainly made up of savannah and 2,590 hectares of the area have been proposed as a game sanctuary.

References

See also
Protected areas of Sierra Leone

Geographical regions
Geography of Sierra Leone
Southern Province, Sierra Leone
Protected areas of Sierra Leone